Vallesa de la Guareña is a municipality located in the province of Zamora, Castile and León, Spain. According to the 2015 census (INE), the municipality has a population of 106 inhabitants.

History

Transportation

Main sights

The Church of San Juan Bautista.
The Mudéjar Church of San Andrés in Olmo de La Guareña from the 13th century, recently protected as B.I.C.

References

External links
  Asociación de Mancomunidades de Toro-Guareña-Vino

Municipalities of the Province of Zamora